Paul Haarhuis and Cédric Pioline were the defending champion, but Haarhuis did not play this year.Pioline partnered up with Arnaud Boetsch, but they were eliminated by Goran Ivanišević and Michael Stich in the round-robin stage.Yevgeny Kafelnikov and Andriy Medvedev won in the final 6–1, 6–1 against Ivanisevic and Stich.

Draw

Final

Group A
Standings are determined by: 1. number of wins; 2. number of matches; 3. in three-players-ties, percentage of sets won, or of games won; 4. steering-committee decision.

Group B
Standings are determined by: 1. number of wins; 2. number of matches; 3. in three-players-ties, percentage of sets won, or of games won; 4. steering-committee decision.

References
Completed matches (Legends Under 45 Doubles), accessed 04/06/10.

Legends Under 45 Doubles